"Nokor Reach" (also spelt Nokoreach; ,) is the national anthem of Cambodia. It is based on a Cambodian folk tune and was written by Chuon Nath.

History
"Nokor Reach" originated from a folk poetry usually performed with chapei in ancient era for storytelling and to disclose any recent events.

The music of "Nokor Reach" was composed between 1938 and 1939 by Prince Norodom Suramarit during the reign of King Sisowath Monivong with help of Sir J. Jekyll and Sir François Perruchot, the Royal Palace's musical instructors. The lyrics were not finished until 20 July 1941 by Choun Nath, a few months after King Norodom Sihanouk's coronation. In the same year, it was adopted then reconfirmed in 1947 as a national anthem for the country.

In 1970, the monarchy was abolished by the Khmer Republic, thereby replacing the state's national anthem as well. After the communists' victory in 1975, former royalist symbols, including "Nokor Reach", were reinstated for a short while. The Khmer Rouge then replaced it with "Dap Prampi Mesa Chokchey" ("Glorious Seventeenth of April") in January 1976. After the royalist party FUNCINPEC defeated the former communists (Cambodian People's Party) in the 1993 elections, the royalist state anthem was restored.

Lyrics
"Nokor Reach" is a poem consisting of three verses and each verse consists of five lines.

See also 

 "March of the Khmer Republic" (Khmer Republic's national anthem [1970–1975])
 "Dap Prampi Mesa Chokchey" (Democratic Kampuchea's national anthem [1976–1979])
 Anthem of the People’s Republic of Kampuchea (People's Republic of Kampuchea and revised as the State of Cambodia's national anthem [1979–1989]–[1989–1993])

 National symbols of Cambodia
 Angkor Wat
 Krama

Notes

References

External links 

 Cambodia: "Nokor Reach" - Audio of the national anthem of Cambodia, with information and lyrics
 Nokor Reach Instrumental VDO clip on YouTube
 Nokor Reach with lyrics VDO clip on YouTube
 Cambodian National Anthem - The page "Cambodian View" includes a page about the anthem, which includes a vocal version of the anthem.

Cambodian songs
National symbols of Cambodia
National anthems
Asian anthems
National anthem compositions in F major
National anthem compositions in G minor